Will Dean (born 1980) is an entrepreneur who founded and was CEO of endurance event company Tough Mudder and co-founded Immersive Gamebox (previously Electric Gamebox), where he is currently CEO.

Born in Sheffield in 1980, Dean is a native of Nottinghamshire, in England's East Midlands. He studied at Bristol University in the UK.

Dean completed an MBA at Harvard Business School. During his time at Harvard, he created obstacle course racing company Tough Mudder. He left Tough Mudder in 2019 focusing full-time on Electric Gamebox. Dean published a book about his time at Tough Mudder, It Takes a Tribe, in 2017.

He was named on Crain's annual "40 Under 40" list in 2012, ranked #2 in Fortune's '40 Under 40: Ones to Watch' list, received the US National EY Entrepreneur Of The Year Emerging Award, was on the Sports Business Journal 40 under 40 in 2017, and received an MBE in 2017.

References 

1980 births
Living people
British businesspeople
Alumni of the University of Bristol
Harvard Business School alumni